The 1983 Idaho Vandals football team represented the University of Idaho in the 1983 NCAA Division I-AA football season. The Vandals, led by second-year head coach Dennis Erickson, were members of the Big Sky Conference and played their home games at the Kibbie Dome, an indoor facility on campus in Moscow, Idaho.

Led by senior quarterback Ken Hobart, the Vandals finished 8–3 in the regular season and 4–3 in the Big Sky to tie for third with rival Boise State, whom they defeated in consecutive years for the first time. It was Idaho's first win in Moscow in the series in six tries, and was the second of twelve straight over the Broncos, through 1993.

The Vandals won four of five home games in 1983, losing to Nevada for the fifth year in a row.   They also lost to conference runner-up Idaho State; both of whom were selected for the 12-team I-AA playoffs. Idaho won all four of its non-conference games, but three were against Division II and NAIA opponents.

Although Idaho missed the postseason, 1983 marked the first time in 45 years that the Vandals had consecutive winning seasons in football, last accomplished in 1938 under head coach Ted Bank. After just two seasons, Erickson's seventeen victories placed him sixth in career wins among Vandal head coaches.

Notable players
Senior quarterback Ken Hobart, a walk-on four-year starter, led the 1983 Vandals to an 8–3 record and named a Division I-AA All-American. Selected in the second round of the 1984 USFL Draft by Jacksonville, he was traded to Denver during the season and then spent six seasons (1985–90) in the CFL. He was selected tenth in the 1984 NFL Supplemental Draft by the New York Jets, but never played in the NFL.

Schedule

Roster

All-conference
Quarterback Hobart, flanker Brian Allen, and safety Boyce Bailey were named to the Big Sky all-conference  Hobart repeated as the league's outstanding offensive player. Vandals named to the second team were tight end Kurt Vestman, wide receiver Ron Whittenburg, running back Kerry Hickey, guard Lance West, and linebacker / defensive end

NFL Draft
One Vandal senior was selected in the 1984 NFL Draft in early May, which lasted twelve rounds (336 selections).

All-American quarterback Ken Hobart was a second round selection of the Jacksonville Bulls in the 1984 USFL Draft in early January, and signed a contract later that month.

List of Idaho Vandals in the NFL Draft

References

External links
Gem of the Mountains: 1984 University of Idaho yearbook – 1983 football season
Idaho Argonaut – student newspaper – 1983 editions

Idaho
Idaho Vandals football seasons
Idaho Vandals football